Maurepas may refer to:
 Jean-Frédéric Phélypeaux, Count of Maurepas, French statesman Count of Maurepas (Yvelines)
 Fort Maurepas, also known as Old Biloxi, a settlement in Louisiana (New France)
 Maurepas, Louisiana, an unincorporated community in the United States
 Lake Maurepas, a lake in Louisiana, United States
 Fort Maurepas (Canada), a fort in Manitoba
 Maurepas, Somme, a French commune in the Somme département
 Maurepas, Yvelines, a French commune in the Yvelines département, the place of origin of Jean-Frédéric Phélypeaux and all nickesames of Maurepas.